This is a list of diplomatic missions of the People's Republic of China. The People's Republic of China has the largest diplomatic network in the world, representing the country's significant economic, commercial, political, cultural, and military links around the world.

For over fifty years the PRC has been competing with the Republic of China for diplomatic recognition in the international community. Until the 1970s, most countries in the world recognized the Republic of China instead of the People's Republic of China. As of 2018, a small number of states have full diplomatic relations with the ROC (see Republic of China diplomatic missions); the ROC maintains unofficial relations with most states.

Much like the US, the PRC does not have honorary consulates in other countries.  In 2015, China opened its largest diplomatic mission in Pakistan.

Africa

 Algiers (Embassy)

 Luanda (Embassy)

 Cotonou (Embassy)

 Gaborone (Embassy)

 Ouagadougou (Embassy)

 Bujumbura (Embassy)

 Yaoundé (Embassy)

 Praia (Embassy)

 Bangui (Embassy)

 N'Djamena (Embassy)

 Moroni (Embassy)

 Brazzaville (Embassy)

 Kinshasa (Embassy)

 Djibouti City (Embassy)

 Cairo (Embassy)
 Alexandria (Consulate General)

 Malabo (Embassy)
 Bata (Consulate General)

 Asmara (Embassy)

 Addis Ababa (Embassy)

 Libreville (Embassy)

 Banjul (Embassy)

 Accra (Embassy)

 Conakry (Embassy)

 Bissau (Embassy)

 Abidjan (Embassy)

 Nairobi (Embassy)

 Maseru (Embassy)

 Monrovia (Embassy)

 Tripoli (Embassy)

 Antananarivo (Embassy)

 Lilongwe (Embassy)

 Bamako (Embassy)

 Nouakchott (Embassy)

 Port Louis (Embassy)

 Rabat (Embassy)

 Maputo (Embassy)

 Windhoek (Embassy)

 Niamey (Embassy)

 Abuja (Embassy)
 Lagos (Consulate General)

 Kigali (Embassy)

 Sao Tome (Embassy)

 Dakar (Embassy)

 Victoria (Embassy)

 Freetown (Embassy)

 Mogadishu (Embassy)

 Pretoria (Embassy)
 Cape Town (Consulate General)
 Durban (Consulate General)
 Johannesburg (Consulate General)

 Juba (Embassy)

 Khartoum (Embassy)

 Dar es Salaam (Embassy)
 Zanzibar (Consulate General)

 Lomé (Embassy)

 Tunis (Embassy)

 Kampala (Embassy)

 Lusaka (Embassy)

 Harare (Embassy)

Americas

 St. John's (Embassy)

 Buenos Aires (Embassy)

 Nassau (Embassy)

 Bridgetown (Embassy)

 La Paz (Embassy)
 Santa Cruz (Consulate General)

 Brasília (Embassy) 
 Recife (Consulate General)
 Rio de Janeiro (Consulate General)
 São Paulo (Consulate General)

 Ottawa (Embassy)
 Calgary (Consulate General)
 Montreal (Consulate General)
 Toronto (Consulate General)
 Vancouver (Consulate General)

 Santiago (Embassy)
 Iquique (Consulate General)

 Bogotá (Embassy)

 San José (Embassy)

 Havana (Embassy)

 Roseau (Embassy)

 Santo Domingo (Embassy)

 Quito (Embassy)
 Guayaquil (Consulate General)

 San Salvador (Embassy)

St. George's (Embassy)

 Georgetown (Embassy)

 Port-au-Prince (Trade office)

 Kingston (Embassy)

 Mexico City (Embassy)
 Tijuana (Consulate General)

 Managua (Embassy)

 Panama City (Embassy)

 Lima (Embassy)

 Paramaribo (Embassy)

 Port of Spain (Embassy)

 Washington, D.C. (Embassy)
 Chicago (Consulate General)
 Los Angeles (Consulate General)
 New York City (Consulate General)
 San Francisco (Consulate General)

 Montevideo (Embassy)

 Caracas (Embassy)

Asia

 Kabul (Embassy)

 Yerevan (Embassy)

 Baku (Embassy)

 Manama (Embassy)

 Dhaka (Embassy)

 Bandar Seri Begawan (Embassy)

 Phnom Penh (Embassy)
 Siem Reap (Consular Office)
 Sihanoukville (Consular Office)

 Dili (Embassy)

 Tbilisi (Embassy)

 New Delhi (Embassy)
 Kolkata (Consulate General)
 Mumbai (Consulate General)

 Jakarta (Embassy)
 Medan (Consulate General)
 Surabaya (Consulate General)
 Denpasar (Consulate General)

 Tehran (Embassy)
 Bandar Abbas (Consulate General)

 Baghdad (Embassy)
 Erbil (Consulate General)

 Tel Aviv (Embassy)

 Tokyo (Embassy)
 Fukuoka (Consulate General)
 Nagasaki (Consulate General)
 Nagoya (Consulate General)
 Niigata (Consulate General)
 Osaka (Consulate General)
 Sapporo (Consulate General)

 Amman (Embassy)

 Astana (Embassy)
 Almaty (Consulate General)

 Kuwait City (Embassy)

 Bishkek (Embassy)

 Vientiane (Embassy)
 Luang Prabang (Consulate General)

 Beirut (Embassy)

 Kuala Lumpur (Embassy)
 George Town (Consulate General)
 Kuching (Consulate General)
 Kota Kinabalu (Consulate General)

 Malè (Embassy)

 Ulaanbaatar (Embassy)
 Zamyn-Üüd (Consulate General)

 Yangon (Embassy)
 Mandalay (Consulate General)

 Kathmandu (Embassy)

 Pyongyang (Embassy)
 Chongjin (Consulate General)

 Muscat (Embassy)

 Islamabad (Embassy)
 Karachi (Consulate General)
 Lahore (Consulate General)

 Manila (Embassy)
 Cebu (Consular General)
 Laoag (Consulate)
 Davao (Consulate General)

 Ramallah (Office)

 Doha (Embassy)

 Riyadh (Embassy)
 Jeddah (Consulate General)

 Singapore (Embassy)

 Seoul (Embassy)
 Busan (Consulate General)
 Gwangju (Consulate General)
 Jeju (Consulate General)

 Colombo (Embassy)

 Damascus (Embassy)

 Dushanbe (Embassy)

 Bangkok (Embassy)
 Chiang Mai (Consulate General)
 Phuket (Consular Office)
 Songkhla (Consulate General)
 Khon Kaen (Consulate General)

 Ankara (Embassy)
 Istanbul (Consulate General)

 Ashgabat (Embassy)

 Abu Dhabi (Embassy)
 Dubai (Consulate General)

 Tashkent (Embassy)

 Hanoi (Embassy)
 Da Nang (Consulate General)
 Ho Chi Minh City (Consulate General)

Europe

 Tirana (Embassy)

 Vienna (Embassy)

 Minsk (Embassy)

 Brussels (Embassy)

 Sarajevo (Embassy)

 Sofia (Embassy)

 Zagreb (Embassy)

 Nicosia (Embassy)

 Prague (Embassy)

 Copenhagen (Embassy)

 Tallinn (Embassy)

 Helsinki (Embassy)

 Paris (Embassy)
 Lyon (Consulate General)
 Marseille (Consulate General)
 Strasbourg (Consulate General)
 Papeete,  (Consulate)
 Saint-Denis,  (Consulate General)

 Berlin (Embassy)
 Düsseldorf (Consulate General)
 Frankfurt (Consulate General)
 Hamburg (Consulate General)
 Munich (Consulate General)

 Athens (Embassy)

 Budapest (Embassy)

 Reykjavík (Embassy)

 Dublin (Embassy)

 Rome (Embassy)
 Florence (Consulate General)
 Milan (Consulate General)

Pristina (Liaison office)

 Riga (Embassy)

 Vilnius (Embassy office)

 Luxembourg (Embassy)

 Valletta (Embassy)

 Chişinău (Embassy)

 Podgorica (Embassy)

 The Hague (Embassy)
 Willemstad, Curaçao (Consulate General)

 Skopje (Embassy)

 Oslo (Embassy)

 Warsaw (Embassy)
 Gdańsk (Consulate General)

 Lisbon (Embassy)

 Bucharest (Embassy)

 Moscow (Embassy)
 Irkutsk (Consulate General)
 Kazan (Consulate General)
 Khabarovsk (Consulate General)
 Saint Petersburg (Consulate General)
 Vladivostok (Consulate General)
 Yekaterinburg (Consulate General)

 Belgrade (Embassy)

 Bratislava (Embassy)

 Ljubljana (Embassy)

 Madrid (Embassy)
 Barcelona (Consulate General)

 Stockholm (Embassy)
 Gothenburg (Consulate General)

 Bern (Embassy)
 Zürich (Consulate General)

 Kyiv (Embassy)
 Odesa (Consulate General)

 London (Embassy)
 Belfast (Consulate General)
 Edinburgh (Consulate General)
 Manchester (Consulate General)

Oceania

 Canberra (Embassy)
 Adelaide (Consulate General)
 Brisbane (Consulate General)
 Melbourne (Consulate General)
 Perth (Consulate General)
 Sydney (Consulate General)

 Suva (Embassy)

 Palikir (Embassy)

 Tarawa (Embassy)

 Wellington (Embassy)
 Auckland (Consulate General)
 Christchurch (Consulate General)

 Port Moresby (Embassy)

 Apia (Embassy)

 Honiara (Embassy)

 Nuku’alofa (Embassy)

 Port Vila (Embassy)

Non-resident embassies

 (Madrid)
 (Wellington)
 (Zürich)
 (Paris)
 (Wellington)
 (Rome)

Offices in other Chinese jurisdictions

Multilateral organizations

 : Jakarta (Permanent Mission, 驻东盟使团)
 : Brussels (Permanent Mission, 驻欧盟使团)
 : Addis Ababa (Permanent Mission, 驻非盟使团)
  International Seabed Authority: Kingston (Permanent Mission, 常驻国际海底管理局代表处)
 International Civil Aviation Organization: Montreal (Permanent Mission, 常驻国际民航组织理事会代表处)
 Organisation for the Prohibition of Chemical Weapons: Hague (Permanent Mission, 常驻禁止化学武器组织代表团)
 : Paris (Permanent Mission, 常驻联合国教科文组织代表团)
 :
Geneva (Permanent Mission, 常驻联合国日内瓦办事处和瑞士其他国际组织代表团)
New York City (Permanent Mission, 常驻联合国代表团)
Vienna (Permanent Mission, 常驻维也纳联合国和其他国际组织代表团)
  United Nations Economic and Social Commission for Asia and the Pacific: Bangkok (Permanent Mission, 常驻联合国亚洲及太平洋经济和社会委员会代表处)
 WTO: Geneva (Permanent Mission, 常驻世界贸易组织代表团)

Former embassies

Gallery

See also 

 Foreign relations of the People's Republic of China
 Ambassadors of the People's Republic of China
 List of diplomatic missions in China
 United States bombing of the Chinese Embassy in Belgrade
 Foreign relations of the Republic of China
 List of diplomatic missions of Taiwan
 List of diplomatic missions in Taiwan
 Foreign relations of imperial China

References

External links 

 The Ministry of Foreign Affairs of the People's Republic of China 
 Ministry of Foreign Affairs of the People's Republic of China - Missions Overseas 

 
Diplomatic missions
China peoples